Collagen alpha-1(XIX) chain is a protein that in humans is encoded by the COL19A1 gene.

This gene encodes the alpha chain of type XIX collagen, a member of the FACIT collagen family (fibril-associated collagens with interrupted helices). Although the function of this collagen is not known, other members of this collagen family are found in association with fibril-forming collagens such as type I and II, and serve to maintain the integrity of the extracellular matrix. The transcript produced from this gene has an unusually large 3' UTR which has not been completely sequenced.

References

Further reading

Collagens